{{Infobox film
|name           = Night Watch
|image          = Night Watch (1928 film).jpg
|caption        = Film poster
|director       = Alexander Korda
|producer       = Ned Marin
| based_on       = {{based on|'In the Night Watch1921 play|Michael MortonVeille d'Armes1917 play by Claude Farrère and Lucien Nepoty}}
|writer         = Lajos Bíró (continuity)Dwinelle Benthall (titles)Rufus McCosh (titles)|starring       = Billie DovePaul LukasDonald ReedNicholas Soussanin
|music          = Emil BiermanMortimer Wilson
|editing        = George McGuire
|cinematography = Karl Struss
|studio         = First National Pictures
|distributor    = First National PicturesWarner Bros. Pictures
|released       = 
|runtime        = 72 minutes
|country        = United States
|language       = SilentEnglish intertitles 
}}Night Watch is a 1928 American drama film directed by Alexander Korda and starring Billie Dove, Paul Lukas and Donald Reed. It was an adaptation of the dramatic 1921 play In the Night Watch, written by Michael Morton. The film is set almost entirely on a French warship at the beginning of the First World War. Although largely a silent film, Night Watch was the first of Korda's films to feature sound effects and music but no dialogue from Vitaphone.The Night Watch at silentera.com

Plot
On the night of August 1, 1914, Commander Corlaix of the French Navy and his wife, Yvonne, arrange a shipboard dinner for the officers of his cruiser. Afterward, Lieutenant D'Artelle asks Yvonne to stay on board with him, and when Corlaix (learning by classified wireless that war has been declared) abruptly orders her from the ship, she goes instead with D'Artelle to his cabin. The ship is sunk by a torpedo, and Corlaix is brought before the Admiralty Court on charges of incompetence. Yvonne comes forward to testify and, by compromising herself, proves her husband's adherence to duty. Corlaix, realizing Yvonne's great love for him, forgives her for her indiscretions, and they are reunited.

Cast
 Billie Dove as Yvonne Corlaix 
 Paul Lukas as Captain Corlaix 
 Donald Reed as Lieutenant D'Artelle 
 Nicholas Soussanin as Officer Brambourg 
 Nicholas Bela as Leduc 
 George Periolat as Fargasson 
 William H. Tooker as Mobrayne 
 Gusztáv Pártos as Dagorne 
 Anita Garvin as Ann

Preservation status
A print of Night Watch'' is preserved at Cineteca Italiana in Milan.

References

External links
 
 
 
 

American silent feature films
Silent American drama films
Films directed by Alexander Korda
First National Pictures films
American films based on plays
1928 drama films
American black-and-white films
1920s American films